Joseph C. Boteler III (born June 30, 1949) is an American politician who was elected in 2002 to represent District 8 of the Maryland House of Delegates in Baltimore County along with Alfred W. Redmer Jr. and Eric Bromwell.  Alfred W. Redmer Jr. resigned in 2003 to accept an appointment as Maryland Insurance Commissioner and was replaced by John Cluster.  In 2006, he won again along with Eric M. Bromwell and Todd Schuler.

Career
Boteler has been the owner of Print Solutions since 1999.  He is a member of the Parkville Business and Professional Association and the Overlea Fullerton Business and Professional Association, along with the Direct Marketing Association of Washington.

As a member of the Maryland House of Delegates, Boteler was nominated to be the Deputy Minority Whip in 2007.  He was co-chair of the Maryland Veterans Caucus and since 2005 has been a member of the Charles Hickey, Jr. School Advisory Board.

Legislative notes
voted against the Clean Indoor Air Act of 2007 (HB359)
 voted against the Healthy Air Act in 2006 (SB154)
 voted for slots in 2005 (HB1361)
 voted against in-state tuition for illegal immigrants in 2007 (HB6)

Election results
2010 Race for Maryland House of Delegates – District 08
Voters to choose three:
{| class="wikitable"
|-
!Name
!Votes
!Percent
!Outcome
|-
|-
|Joseph C. Boteler III
|21,427
|  19.49%
|   Won
|-
|-
|John Cluster
|19,237
|  17.5%
|   Won
|-
|-
|Eric M. Bromwell
|18,966
|  17.25%
|   Won
|-
|-
|Ruth Baisden
|18,223
|  16.57%
|   Lost
|-
|-
|Norman Secoura
|16,267
|  14.79%
|   Lost
|-
|-
|Cal Bowman
|15,757
|  14.33%
|   Lost
|-
|Other Write-Ins
|80
|  0.1%
|   Lost
|-
|}

2006 Race for Maryland House of Delegates – District 08
Voters to choose three:
{| class="wikitable"
|-
!Name
!Votes
!Percent
!Outcome
|-
|-
|Eric M. Bromwell
|20,116
|  17.9%
|   Won
|-
|-
|Joseph C. Boteler III
|19,586
|  17.4%
|   Won
|-
|-
|Todd Schuler
|18,356
|  16.3%
|   Won
|-
|-
|Ruth Baisden
|18,261
|  16.2%
|   Lost
|-
|-
|Melissa Redmer Mullahey
|18,160
|  16.1%
|   Lost
|-
|-
|John Cluster
|18,057
|  16.0%
|   Lost
|-
|Other Write-Ins
|74
|  0.1%
|   Lost
|-
|}

2002 Race for Maryland House of Delegates – District 08
Voters to choose three:
{| class="wikitable"
|-
!Name
!Votes
!Percent
!Outcome
|-
|-
|Alfred W. Redmer, Jr.
|22,884
|  19.61%
|   Won
|-
|-
|Eric M. Bromwell
|20,314
|  17.41%
|   Won
|-
|-
|Joseph C. Boteler III
|19,826
|  16.99%
|   Won
|-
|-
|Mike Rupp
|18,755
|  16.07%
|   Lost
|-
|-
|Tim Caslin
|18,553
|  15.90%
|   Lost
|-
|-
|Todd Schuler
|16,277
|  13.95%
|   Lost
|-
|Other Write-Ins
|86
|  0.07%
|   Lost
|-
|}

1998 Race for Maryland House of Delegates – District 08
Voters to choose three:
{| class="wikitable"
|-
!Name
!Votes
!Percent
!Outcome
|-
|-
|Katherine Klausmeier
|19,835
|  21%
|   Won
|-
|-
|Alfred W. Redmer Jr.
|17,846
|  19%
|   Won
|-
|-
|James F. Ports, Jr.
|17,756
|  19%
|   Won
|-
|-
|J. Joseph Curran III
|17,583
|  19%
|   Lost
|-
|-
|Joseph C. Boteler III
|11,306
|  12%
|   Lost
|-
|-
|Taras Andrew Vizzi
|9,927
|  11%
|   Lost
|}

References and notes

External links
 https://web.archive.org/web/20070827154422/http://www.joeboteler.com/
 http://www.msa.md.gov/msa/mdmanual/06hse/html/msa13982.html

Republican Party members of the Maryland House of Delegates
1949 births
People from Baltimore County, Maryland
Living people
21st-century American politicians